The UCF Knights women's soccer program represents the University of Central Florida in National Collegiate Athletics Association (NCAA) Division I. The Knights compete in the American Athletic Conference (The American) through the 2022 season, after which they will join the Big 12 Conference. UCF plays home games on its main campus in Orlando, Florida at the UCF Soccer and Track Stadium. The Knights are led by head coach and Olympic gold medalist Tiffany Roberts Sahaydak.

History
The Knights soccer program began in 1981 under Jim Rudy, who also started the men's soccer program at UCF in 1975. The Knights went 11–3–0 in their inaugural year, defeating Miami in their first match 20–0. Rudy led the Knights to the AIAW Finals in their first year. UCF faced North Carolina in the final AIAW Championship, falling 1–0. The Knights returned to the Finals in 1982, falling again to North Carolina 2–0 in the first NCAA Women's Soccer Tournament. The first two NCAA Tournaments were held at UCF.

In 1993, the team joined their first conference, the Trans America Athletic Conference (which became the Atlantic Sun Conference in 2001), where they remained until joining Conference USA in 2005. In 2013, UCF joined the American Athletic Conference. In 30 seasons, the Knights have had a losing record only twice, and have earned a bid to 16 NCAA Tournaments, including 5 straight through 2011. UCF has earned more trips to the NCAA Tournament than any other Florida school. In 2011, the Knights became the first unseeded tournament team to defeat the North Carolina Tar Heels, who have won 20 NCAA Women's Soccer Championships. UCF defeated UNC 5–4 on penalty kicks in the Sweet Sixteen before falling 3–0 to Wake Forest in the Elite Eight.

Stadium
The Knights play their home games at the UCF Soccer and Track Stadium, part of Knights Plaza, on the north end of UCF's main campus in Orlando, Florida. The soccer field is made of natural grass and measures  x .

In 2011, the stadium was heavily renovated, boasting a 2,000-seat capacity with a new 1,475-seat stand, press box,  clubhouse, restrooms and new entrance on the west side of the facility. The original 500-seat stand was retained as a visitors' stand.

Coaches

Seasons

Alumni
UCF has produced a number of notable soccer stars. Most notably, Michelle Akers, Amy Allmann and Kim Wyant. Akers and Wyant were founding players on the United States women's national soccer team from 1985 to 2000. Akers helped them win the FIFA Women's World Cup in 1991 and 1999, and the 1996 Summer Olympics. Her career was so distinguished that Pelé named her among only two female players (along with teammate Mia Hamm) on the FIFA 100 list of the greatest living soccer players in 2004. In addition, Aline Reis, an All-American in her freshman year in 2008, was selected to the Brazil women's national football team for the first time in 2009, playing in a friendly against a local Brazilian team in July.

See also
 UCF Knights men's soccer
 List of University of Central Florida alumni

References

External links

 

 
Soccer clubs in Florida
1981 establishments in Florida